Pygmy ground squirrels are small ground squirrels in the genus Xerospermophilus, family Sciuridae, containing four species from Mexico and the United States. The members of this genus were formerly placed in the large ground squirrel genus Spermophilus. Since DNA sequencing of the cytochrome b gene has shown Spermophilus to be paraphyletic to the prairie dogs and marmots, this group is now separated, along with six other genera. Within the genus, the Mohave ground squirrel and the round-tailed ground squirrel were thought to be close relatives, sometimes a subgenus Xerospermophilus, while the spotted ground squirrel and the Perote ground squirrel were placed in the subgenus (now a genus) Ictidomys.

The name of the genus is a combination of the Greek word xeros, "dry", and Spermophilus, which also comes from Greek, meaning "seed lovers".

Species 
The four species in Xerospermophilus are listed below. These are the same species that were previously grouped in the subgenus Otospermophilus.

 Mohave ground squirrel, Xerospermophilus mohavensis
 Perote ground squirrel, Xerospermophilus perotensis
 Spotted ground squirrel, Xerospermophilus spilosoma
 Round-tailed ground squirrel, Xerospermophilus tereticaudus

References 

 
Rodent genera
Taxa named by Clinton Hart Merriam